Nordfjord (—in contrast to Sunnfjord) is a traditional district of Norway.

Geography
The region is located in the northern part of Vestland county in Western Norway. It centers on the Nordfjorden and it comprises the municipalities of Selje, Vågsøy, Bremanger, Eid, Gloppen, Hornindal, and Stryn.

The fjord is the sixth longest in Norway stretching  from the island of Husevågøy at the mouth to the village of Loen at the other end. The region encompasses the rough coastline of the Stadlandet peninsula to the Jostedalsbreen, Europe's largest mainland glacier. The glacier Briksdalsbreen is particularly scenic. The Stryn area provides year-round alpine skiing, and there are numerous old fishing communities along the fjord going back to pre-Viking times.

Population

References

External links

Nordfjord promotional web site
Nordfjord - official travel guide to Norway

Districts of Vestland